The Coptic Orthodox Church in Australia is organised into two Coptic Orthodox dioceses with over 50 parishes, three monasteries, two theological colleges and four schools. The church is a member of the National Council of Churches in Australia. According to the 2006 Census of Australia, there were a total of 19,928 followers of Coptic Orthodoxy nationally. Currently, the church has as many as  100,000 members in Australia (in Sydney alone it is estimated that there are 70,000 Copts, with numbers in Melbourne in the tens of thousands).

Dioceses 
 Diocese of Melbourne and Affiliated Regions led by Bishop Anba Suriel since 1999: Victoria, Tasmania, South Australia, Western Australia, Australian Capital Territory, New Zealand, Fiji
 Diocese of Sydney and Affiliated Regions led by Bishop Anba Daniel since 2002: New South Wales, Queensland, Northern Territory, Thailand, Singapore, Malaysia, Japan, Mainland China, Indonesia

See also
Coptic Australians
List of Coptic Orthodox churches in Australia
List of Coptic Orthodox popes of Alexandria
Patriarch of Alexandria
Pope Shenouda III of Alexandria
Holy Synod of the Coptic Orthodox Church
Coptic Orthodox Church in Europe
Oriental Orthodox Churches
Copts
Coptic alphabet
Coptic calendar
Coptic art
Coptic language
Coptic music
Fasting and abstinence of the Coptic Orthodox Church of Alexandria
Coptic Orphans
Coptic diaspora
Coptic Americans
Coptic Canadians

References

 The Coptic Orthodox Church of Australia 1969-1995 by Fr Matthew Attia (formerly Maged Attia)

External links
Coptic Orthodox Diocese of Melbourne
St Mark Coptic Orthodox Church, Canberra
Coptic Orthodox Diocese of Sydney
Pope Tawadros II

 
Christian denominations in Australia